The Hardy Trail is a paved multi-use recreational trail in Dade City, Florida. It follows the path of a segment of the Seaboard Air Line Railroad line where it ran through Dade City. This line was originally built between Zephyrhills and Lacoochee by the Florida Central and Peninsular Railroad, but was abandoned after SAL merged with the Atlantic Coast Line Railroad to form the Seaboard Coast Line Railroad. It was named after former residents Roy and Martha Hardy, and is used primarily by local residents seeking exercise and recreation. The southern half of the trail is nearly always shaded by the woods through which it runs.
A visitor information center is now under construction at the northern end where the trail meets Church Street.

See also
Withlacoochee State Trail
Good Neighbor Trail

References

External links
Hardy Trail (TrailLink)

Rail trails in Florida
Former CSX Transportation lines
Protected areas of Pasco County, Florida
Bike paths in Florida
Hiking trails in Florida